The Third Lake is a lake in Thunder Bay District, Ontario, Canada. It is part of the Pays Plat river system, which flows into Lake Superior, and the primary outflow is an unnamed creek to Triangle Lake.

References

Lakes of Thunder Bay District